Joseph-Adéodat Blanchette (August 7, 1893 – November 14, 1968) was a Canadian politician and merchant. He was elected to the House of Commons of Canada as a Member of the Liberal Party to represent the riding of Compton. During his time in parliament, he was the Chief Government Whip's assistant and Deputy Whip of the Liberal Party. He later became the Parliamentary Assistant to the Minister of National Defence followed by Parliamentary Assistant to the Minister of Labour.

External links
 

1893 births
Liberal Party of Canada MPs
Members of the House of Commons of Canada from Quebec
1968 deaths